6,6'-Bieckol is an eckol-type phlorotannin found in the brown algae Ecklonia cava and ''Ecklonia stolonifera.

References 

Phlorotannins
Phlorotannin dimers